Turkey participated in the 2013 Islamic Solidarity Games held in Palembang, Indonesia from 18 September to 1 October 2013. 160 athletes from Turkey were registered to compete in 12 sports at the Games.

Medalists

| width="78%" align="left" valign="top" |

| width="22%" align="left" valign="top" |

References

2013
Islamic Solidarity Games